Gary Calamar is a five-time Grammy Award-nominated film and television music supervisor whose credits include: The Man In The High Castle, Six Feet Under, True Blood, House, Weeds, Entourage, Dexter, and Varsity Blues. He is also an American DJ, who hosted a long-running program on the influential radio station KCRW in Santa Monica, CA. He eventually moved to 88.5 KCSN in September 2018. Gary is also a songwriter and recording artist.

Biography

Early life
Born in the Bronx and raised in Yonkers, NY, Calamar developed an early fascination with music and radio by listening to WNEW-FM.  He told journalist Tony Pierce in a 2007 interview: "I …was the kid who kept a transistor radio under his pillow. I was a big fan of WNEW-FM and their amazing staff of DJ's. I remember Scott Muni, Pete Fornatelle, Allison Steel 'The Night Bird' and Dave Herman. I was listening when John Lennon surprised Dennis Elsas on the air and guest DJ'd."

Calamar migrated to Los Angeles in the early 1980s.  His intense interest in music eventually led him to manage Los Angeles-area boutique record stores Licorice Pizza, Moby Disc and Rhino Records.  It was at Licorice Pizza that he met musician Jeff Davis. Calamar was enlisted to manage Davis' band, The Balancing Act, who went on to release three critically acclaimed albums on IRS Records.

KCRW
In addition to his record store work, Calamar volunteered in the music library of highly influential NPR station KCRW in the early 1990s, opening mail and filing CDs.

He quickly made his way on to the airwaves. He described his transition from volunteer to DJ to Tony Pierce: "I got to know Chris Douridas who was music director and host of Morning Becomes Eclectic at the time. One day he casually mentioned that they were looking for a Saturday-Sunday overnight DJ... I dropped to my knees and begged Chris to give me a shot...and he did."

Calamar's Sunday night radio program (known as The Open Road until a KCRW policy change in 2008 eliminated music show names) featured a blend of contemporary and classic rock, pop, and folk music.  He called it "adventurous pop music both timely and timeless".  He conducted on-air interviews with iconic musical figures including Brian Wilson, Lucinda Williams, Jeff Tweedy from Wilco, Wayne Coyne from The Flaming Lips as well as film composers Elmer Bernstein, Thomas Newman, Lalo Schifrin and Danny Elfman. Calamar's last show on KCRW was Sunday, September 23, 2018.

KCSN
On October 7, 2018, Calamar debuted his Sunday evening show, The Open Road, on The New 88.5 FM (formerly known as KCSN).

Music supervision

Calamar cites the 1998 film Slums Of Beverly Hills as his first major break in the world of music supervision. The following year he co-supervised the number one hit movie Varsity Blues.

In 2001, he and then-professional-partner Thomas Golubić were given the opportunity to work on an HBO series called Six Feet Under, created by American Beauty screenwriter  Alan Ball. The show became hugely influential, as did its soundtracks.  Calamar and Golubic were nominated for Grammy Awards for volumes 1 and 2 of the Six Feet Under soundtracks that they produced.  The final scene in the last episode of Six Feet Under featured the track "Breathe Me" by Sia. The singer often credits this placement as a major event in her career, leading her to both a record deal and wider fame.

In 2006, Calamar founded Go Music to manage his various music supervision projects.

The success of Six Feet Under brought Calamar wide recognition as a music supervisor, leading to his work in some of the most popular and critically acclaimed shows on television; The Man In The High Castle, House, True Blood, Dexter, Weeds, and Entourage.

Calamar produced four soundtrack albums for the Alan Ball HBO series, True Blood (a vampire drama set in Northern Louisiana), which led to Grammy Award nominations in 2010, 2011, and 2013 for "Best Soundtrack Compilation."

In 2010 and 2011, Gary Calamar was honored as “Music Supervisor Of The Year (Television)” by his colleagues in the Guild Of Music Supervisors.

Songwriter and Recording Artist 
In the fall of 2014 Atlantic Records released Gary's debut ep; You Are What You Listen To.

Some of the reviews:

“This is a killer EP and every track is filled to the brim with hooks, attitude and sublime pop musicality.”

-Mike Marrone (Sirius XM's The Loft)

“There's a lifetime of passion for pop music and the craft of recording in this bright shiny E.P. I particularly like “Giddy”, it sums up Gary's enthusiasm for all things musical.”

-Nic Harcourt (KCSN Los Angeles)

 “One of the best rock albums that I've heard this year....Gary Calamar's songs here are infused with great New Wave energy and hooks aplenty. Songs like "She's So Mid-Century" and "I Got An Idea" are full-time pleasures.

-David Wild (Huffington Post, Rolling Stone)

 “Gary’s songs are idiosyncratic gems. They’re reverent to great pop and classic rock but they have a spark of originality that is all Gary. They’re witty, catchy & fun and are a breath of fresh air.”

- Michael Shelley (WFMU New Jersey)

 “One of the best rock albums that I've heard this year....Gary Calamar's songs here are infused with great New Wave energy and hooks aplenty. Songs like "She's So Mid-Century" and "I Got An Idea" are full-time pleasures.

- David Wild (Huffington Post, Editor, Rolling Stone)

Gary followed up with the single “Looking For A Job” / Anti-Social, Young American Christmas Lovers Brigade” in 2015, and “Little Tokyo / “Prince of Pico Blvd.” in 2017

Record Store Days 
In 2010, Calamar's first book was published by Sterling Publishing -- Record Store Days: From Vinyl to Digital and Back Again—co-authored by music journalist Phil Gallo. The lavishly-illustrated volume features a foreword by R.E.M.'s Peter Buck and tells the story of the development of record stores.

Personal life

Gary Calamar lives with his wife and daughter in Los Angeles, California.

References

External links
 True Blood  Official site
 http://www.kcrw.com 
 http://www.885fm.org/programs/gary-calamar/
 http://www.GaryCalamar.com
 https://web.archive.org/web/20090716045300/http://laist.com/

Year of birth missing (living people)
Living people
Record producers from New York (state)
People from Yonkers, New York